San José Insurgentes is a neighborhood located in southwest Mexico City.

Location

San José Insurgentes is located in the Benito Juárez borough of Mexico City.

The neighborhood is bordered by:

Av. Río Mixcoac on the north, across which is Colonia Insurgentes Mixcoac
Av. Revolución on the west, across which is Colonia Merced Gómez and Mixcoac
Barranca del Muerto on the south, across which is Guadalupe Inn in the Álvaro Obregón borough
Avenida de los Insurgentes Sur, across which is Colonia Crédito Constructor

Description
San José Insurgentes is a mixed neighborhood, with both residential zones as well as office buildings, hotels and commerces. The neighborhood is home to the iconic theater Teatro de los Insurgentes.

The colonia has a public park called Parque de la Bola (English: Park of the Ball) which is located exactly at the center of the neighborhood, forming a roundabout that connects the two main avenues of the area: Félix Parra and Plateros.

History
The neighborhood was developed by the Alemán family (that of Mexico's president Miguel Alemán Valdés) in the late years of the 1930s.

Since then, San José Insurgentes has been home to several public figures including president Adolfo Ruiz Cortines, actress María Félix and singer Jorge Negrete. There is a statue of Jorge Negrete located in a roundabout at the streets of Capuchinas and Del Ángel.

Transportation

Public transportation
The area is served by the Mexico City Metrobús.

Metrobus stations
  Teatro Insurgentes

References

Benito Juárez, Mexico City